Emil Bettgenhäuser (October 31, 1906 – November 9, 1982) was a German politician of the Social Democratic Party (SPD) and member of the German Bundestag.

Life 
In 1946/47 Bettgenhäuser was a member of the Consultative State Assembly of Rhineland-Palatinate and deputy chairman of the SPD parliamentary group there. From 1947 until his resignation on 30 September 1949, he was a member of the Rhineland-Palatinate state parliament. There he was also deputy chairman of the parliamentary group and was a member of the Council of Elders, the Committee on Rules of Procedure, the Economic and Transport Committee and the Interim Committee.

He was a member of the German Bundestag from its first election in 1949 to 1961.

Literature

References

1906 births
1982 deaths
Members of the Bundestag for Rhineland-Palatinate
Members of the Bundestag 1957–1961
Members of the Bundestag 1953–1957
Members of the Bundestag 1949–1953
Members of the Bundestag for the Social Democratic Party of Germany
Members of the Landtag of Rhineland-Palatinate